Marģers is a Latvian masculine given name and may refer to:
Marģers Skujenieks (1886-1941), Latvian politician, former Prime Minister of Latvia
Marģers Vestermanis (born 1925), Latvian Holocaust survivor and historian
Marģeris Zariņš (1910–1993), Latvian composer and writer 

Latvian masculine given names